Videoslots is an online casino, founded in 2011 and headquartered in Malta. It is licensed by the Malta Gaming Authority,  Swedish Gambling Authority (Spelinspektionen), the Gambling Commission of the United Kingdom, and the Danish Gambling Authority (Spillemyndigheden). Italian Gambling Authority (AAMS),. Spanish Gambling Authority (DGOJ),

History 
Established in 2011 and based in Malta, Videoslots is an online casino with more than 8,000 gaming slots. Alexander Stevendahl is the founder and chief executive officer. In 2017, Videoslots purchased the technology assets of PKR.com, an online poker operator.

In 2017, the company hosted its first annual awards, named the Videoslots Awards. In 2018, they became an official partner of the Malta Handball Association.

In 2018, Videoslots reached a settlement of £1 million in fines with the UK Gambling Commission (UKGC) regulatory authority for historical failings to “place effective safeguards” within their casino system.

In 2020, Videoslots expanded their product offering and added Sportsbook as a new vertical.

External links 
 Official Site

References 

Online casinos
Online gambling companies of Malta
Gambling companies established in 2011